Videshi Nair Swadeshi Nair is a Malayalam film directed by Paulson. Jagadish plays the lead role in the film.

Plot
Vindhyan is an unemployed village person who lives in the childhood memories of his cousin and lover Neelima, who is settled in the United States. His uncle Rajappan Nair, a wealthy businessman had promised him to marry Neelima to him when she is back home. However, Neelima is engaged to Shivapal, whom she met from US, without the consent of her parents. When she is back home, she decides to proceed with the relation with Shivpal, with the support of her mother.

Meanwhile, Bhaskaran Nair, a well known astrologist predicts that Neelima's first husband will die within ten days of the marriage. With Shivpal's help, Neelima marries Vindhyan, obviously to have him killed. She repeatedly tries to kill him, without success. When Vindhyan discovers his wife's intentions, he expels her from the house.

Neelima and her mother approaches Shivapal, but discovers that he was a criminal whose aim was to cheat Neelima and get all her wealth. Shivapal abducts Neelima and her mother in order to get Neelima signed in certain documents. Rajappan Nair discovers this and with the help of Vindhyan and his friends, he rescues his daughter and wife. Neelima discovers what love is and decides to spend the rest of her life with Vindhyan.

Cast
 Jagadish as Vindhyan
 Mahima as Neelima
 Sai Kumar as Shivapal
 Rajan P. Dev as Rajappan Nair
 Narendra Prasad as Bhaskaran Nair
 Ponnamma Babu as Pathmavathi, Neelima's mother
 Indrans as Kochumpreman, Vindhyan's friend
 Kanakalatha as Suma, Vindhyan's sister
 Bobby Kottarakkara as Ujwalan (servant)
 Jagannathan as Fr. Idikkula

External links
 
 Videsi Nair Swadesi Nair at the Malayalam Movie Database

2000s Malayalam-language films